Dypsis scandens is a species of flowering plant in the family Arecaceae. The species is native to Eastern Madagascar in the area of Ifanadiana.

References 

scandens
Flora of Madagascar
Plants described in 1995
Taxa named by John Dransfield